Minuscule 185 (in the Gregory-Aland numbering), ε 410 (Soden), is a Greek minuscule manuscript of the New Testament, on parchment. Paleographically it has been assigned to the 14th century. It has complex contents, with full marginalia.

Description 

The codex contains a complete text of the four Gospels on 341 parchment leaves (size ). The text is written in one column per page, in 21 lines per page (size of column 14.8 by 8.5 cm), in black ink, the capital letters in red.

There is also a division according to the Ammonian Sections (in Mark 241 Sections – the last in 16:20, though in subscriptions 236 Sections). There is no references to the Eusebian Canons.

Text 

The Greek text of the codex is a representative of the Byzantine text-type. Aland placed it in Category V.
It is classified to the textual Family 1424.
According to the Claremont Profile Method it belongs to the textual cluster 1531.

History 

The manuscript is dated by the INTF to the 14th century.
It was written by one Basil.

It was examined by Birch, Scholz, and Burgon. C. R. Gregory saw it in 1886.

It is currently housed at the Laurentian Library (Plutei. VI. 16), at Florence.

See also 

 List of New Testament minuscules
 Biblical manuscript
 Textual criticism

References

Further reading

External links 
 Minuscule 185 at the Encyclopedia of Textual Criticism

Greek New Testament minuscules
14th-century biblical manuscripts